In Greek mythology, Memphis was the female eponym of Memphis in Egypt. The name was attributed to several distinct characters, namely:

 Memphis, daughter of Nilus.
 Memphis, one of the many consorts of King Danaus of Libya and mother by him of the three Danaïdes: Chrysippe, Sthenele and Cleite. These daughters wed and slayed their cousin-husbands, sons of King Aegyptus of Egypt and Tyria during their wedding night. According to Hippostratus, Danaus had all of his progeny by a single woman, Europe, daughter of the river-god Nilus. In some accounts, he married his cousin Melia, daughter of Agenor, king of Tyre.
 Memphis, daughter of the Egyptian king Uchoreus, who was said to have founded the city and named it after her, and mother by Neilus of Aegyptus, the eponym of Egypt (apparently distinct from Aegyptus, brother of Danaus).

Notes

References 

 Apollodorus, The Library with an English Translation by Sir James George Frazer, F.B.A., F.R.S. in 2 Volumes, Cambridge, MA, Harvard University Press; London, William Heinemann Ltd. 1921. . Online version at the Perseus Digital Library. Greek text available from the same website.
Diodorus Siculus, The Library of History translated by Charles Henry Oldfather. Twelve volumes. Loeb Classical Library. Cambridge, Massachusetts: Harvard University Press; London: William Heinemann, Ltd. 1989. Vol. 3. Books 4.59–8. Online version at Bill Thayer's Web Site
 Diodorus Siculus, Bibliotheca Historica. Vol 1-2. Immanel Bekker. Ludwig Dindorf. Friedrich Vogel. in aedibus B. G. Teubneri. Leipzig. 1888-1890. Greek text available at the Perseus Digital Library.
 Tzetzes, John, Book of Histories, Book VII-VIII translated by Vasiliki Dogani from the original Greek of T. Kiessling's edition of 1826. Online version at theio.com

Egyptian characters in Greek mythology
Women in Greek mythology